Kimberley Marie Wyman (born July 15, 1962) is an American politician who served as the 15th Secretary of State of Washington from 2013 to 2021. Wyman resigned as Secretary of State on November 19, 2021, to work on election security at the Cybersecurity and Infrastructure Security Agency in the Biden administration.

Early life and education
Wyman attended college at California State University, Long Beach and lived abroad after graduation. Barriers to voting in US elections while living in Germany inspired her to become an elections official. She earned her Master of Public Administration degree from Troy University's European Division. Wyman was one of the first public officials to become a Certified Elections/Registration Administrator from Auburn University.

Political career
In 2001, Wyman was appointed as Thurston County Auditor, succeeding Sam Reed. She was elected to the position in 2002 and reelected in 2006 and 2010.

In the 2012 Washington state elections, Wyman was elected Secretary of State, succeeding Sam Reed, narrowly defeating her Democratic opponent, former state Representative Kathleen Drew. Wyman was the only Republican elected to statewide office in the state. She was endorsed in the election by the Walla Walla Union-Bulletin, The Wenatchee World, the Tri-City Herald, and The Seattle Times. The Times cited her bipartisan appeal and experience as an elections administrator in its endorsement. She was also endorsed by the Washington Education Association, which normally endorses Democrats.

In the 2016 elections, Wyman was reelected, defeating former Seattle City Councilwoman Tina Podlodowski with 55% of the vote.

Wyman was re-elected to a third term in the 2020 election, defeating Democratic State Representative Gael Tarleton with 53% of the vote. On October 27, 2021, Wyman announced that she would resign as Secretary of State to join the Cybersecurity and Infrastructure Security Agency in the Biden administration to work on election security. Her resignation took effect on November 19.

Personal life
Wyman lives in Lacey, Washington, with her husband John and their two children. She has run in several marathons.

In March 2017, Wyman was diagnosed with an early form of colon cancer.

Electoral history

References

External links
 Campaign website
 
 Kim Wyman at Project Vote Smart
 
 
 Profile from Thurston County

1962 births
21st-century American politicians
21st-century American women politicians
American expatriates in Germany
California State University, Long Beach alumni
County officials in Washington (state)
Living people
People from Lacey, Washington
Place of birth missing (living people)
Secretaries of State of Washington (state)
Troy University alumni
United States Department of Homeland Security officials
Washington (state) Republicans
Women in Washington (state) politics